Wilhelm Molitor  (pseudonyms Ulric Riesler and Benno  Bronner) (24 August 1819 at Zweibrücken in the Rhine Palatinate – 11 January 1880 at Speyer) was a German poet, novelist, canon lawyer and publicist, and Roman Catholic priest. He was a chief promoter of the Catholic movement in the Palatinate.

Life

After studying philosophy and jurisprudence in Munich and Heidelberg (1836–40), he held various juridical positions in the service of the State from 1843-9. Feeling himself called to the priesthood, he studied theology at Bonn (1849–51) and was ordained priest on 15 March 1851.

In the same year he became secretary to Nicolaus von Weis, Bishop of Speyer; on 11 November 1857, he was elected canon of the cathedral chapter and, soon after, appointed custos of the cathedral, and professor of archæology and homiletics at the episcopal seminary.

He took part in the consultations of the German bishops at Bamberg (1867), Würzburg (1868), and Fulda (1869). In 1868 Pope Pius IX summoned him to Rome as a consultor, ahead of the First Vatican Council.

From 1875-7 he was a member of the Bavarian Landtag. His ultramontane principles made him unacceptable to the Bavarian Government, which in consequence repeatedly prevented his election to the See of Speyer. He founded the "Pfälzicher Pressverein", the daily paper "Rheinpfalz" and the "Katholische Vereinsdruckerei".

Works

He is the author of numerous poems, dramas, novels, sketches on the questions of the day, and a few juridical treatises. A collection of his poems was published in 1884; his "Domlieder" in 1846. His dramas are:

"Kynast" (1844); 
"Maria Magdalena" (1863, 1874); 
"Das alte deutsche Handwerk" (1864); 
"Die Freigelassene Neros" (1865); 
"Claudia Procula" (1867); 
"Julian der Apostat" (1867); 
"Des Kaisers Guenstling", a tragedy of the times of the martyrs (1874); 
"Die Blume von Sicilien" (1880, 1897); 
"Dramatische Spiele", containing the dramatic legend "Sankt Ursulas Rheinfahrt", the comedy "Die Villa bei Amalfi", and the dramatic tale "Schön Gundel" (1878); 
and his three festive plays, - "Weihnachtsbaum" (1867), "Das Hans zu Nazareth" (1872), and "Die Weisen des Morgenlands" (1877).

His novels are:

"Die schöne Zweibrückerin", 2 vols. (1844); 
"Der Jesuit" (1873); 
"Herr von Syllabus" (1873); 
"Memoiren eines Todtenkopfs", 2 vols. (1875); 
"Der Caplan von Friedlingen" (1877); 
 "Der Gast im Kyffhäuser" (1880).

His juridical works are:

"Ueber kanonisches Gerichtsverfahren gegen Cleriker" (1856); 
"Die Immunität des Domes zu Speyer" (1859); "Die Decretale Per Venerabilem" (1876).

He also wrote:

 three volumes of sermons (1880-2); 
"Das Theater in seiner Bedeutung und in seiner gegenwärtigen Stellung" (1866); 
"Ueber Goethes Faust" (1869); 
"Brennende Fragen" (1874); 
"Die Grossmacht der Presse" and "Die Organisation der Katholischen Presse" (1866).

In collaboration with Franz Hülskamp he wrote "Papst Pius IX in seinem Leben und Wirken", 4th ed. (1875) and in collaboration with Wittmer "Rom, Wegweiser durch die ewige Stadt" (1866, 1870).

References

Attribution
 The entry cites:
BRUMMER in Allgemeine Deutsche Biographie, LII (Leipzig, 1906), 438-40; 
KEHREIN, Biographisch-litterarisches Lexikon der katholischen Dichter, 2nd ed., I (Würzburg, 1872), 266-68;
Alte und Neue Welt

1819 births
1880 deaths
19th-century German poets
19th-century German Roman Catholic priests
Members of the Bavarian Chamber of Deputies
Canon law jurists
German male poets
German male dramatists and playwrights
19th-century German dramatists and playwrights
19th-century German male writers
19th-century German writers
19th-century jurists